Tomáš Rataj (born 21 March 2003) is a Czech football striker.

He made his Czech First League debut with SFC Opava in 2020. In 2021 he spent time on loan at Bodø/Glimt, only appearing in two cup matches.

References

2003 births
Living people
Czech footballers
SFC Opava players
FK Bodø/Glimt players
Association football forwards
Czech First League players
Czech expatriate footballers
Expatriate footballers in Norway
Czech expatriate sportspeople in Norway